Joaquim Pueyo (born 30 May 1950) is a French politician representing the Socialist Party. He was re-elected to the French National Assembly on 18 June 2017, representing the department of Orne.

Pueyo had previously been appointed as the head of a prison in Fleury-Merogis in 2007. He had also been mayor of Livaie commune from 1983 to 2008, mayor of Alençon commune between 2008–2017 and from 2020, and councilor of Orne department from 1988 and 2012.

His election as Mayor in 2020 meant that the cumulation of mandates forced his resignation from the national assembly on 2 August 2020.  He was replaced by his substitute, Chantal Jourdan.

See also
 2017 French legislative election

References

1950 births
Living people
Deputies of the 14th National Assembly of the French Fifth Republic
Deputies of the 15th National Assembly of the French Fifth Republic
Socialist Party (France) politicians
People from Alençon
Politicians from Normandy
Mayors of places in Normandy
French people of Spanish descent
Members of Parliament for Orne